P.Errepalli is a village which is located in the district of Chittoor and Mandal of Irala in Andhra Pradesh, India.

Villages in Chittoor district